Richard P. Henrick is an American novelist and screenwriter whose works include Crimson Tide,  Attack on the Queen and Nightwatch. A recognized master of naval fiction and submarine adventure, he has published over 18 books in numerous different  countries and  languages. He was born in St. Louis, Missouri where he still lives and works.

Bibliography 
 Silent Warriors (1985)
 The Phoenix Odyssey (1986)
 Counterforce (1987)
 Flight of the Condor (1987)
 When Duty Calls (1988)
 Beneath the Silent Sea (1988)
 Vampire In Moscow (1988)
 Under the Ice (1988)
 Cry of the Deep (1989)
 Sea Devil (1990)
 The Golden U-boat (1991)
 Sea of Death (1992)
 Dive to Oblivion (1993)
 Ecowar (1993)
 Ice Wolf (1994)
 Crimson Tide (1995)
 Attack on the Queen (1998)
 Nightwatch (1999)

References

External links
 

20th-century American novelists
American male novelists
American male screenwriters
Living people
20th-century American male writers
Ladue Horton Watkins High School alumni
Year of birth missing (living people)